On February 14, 2014, AMCOL International Corporation announced that it has signed a merger agreement with Imerys. The merger, however, was terminated after AMCOL received a rival bid from Minerals Technologies, which AMCOL, deemed to be a superior bid. 

On May 9, 2014, Minerals Technologies Inc., a New York Based international minerals supplier, acquired all the outstanding shares of AMCOL International Corporation. Minerals Technologies is traded on the New York Stock Exchange under the symbol MTX.  

AMCOL International Corp. was a specialty materials and chemicals manufacturer based in Hoffman Estates, Illinois, United States. AMCOL International is no longer traded on the New York Stock Exchange.

References

Chemical companies of the United States
Companies based in Cook County, Illinois
Companies formerly listed on the New York Stock Exchange
Hoffman Estates, Illinois

1927 establishments in Illinois
1927 establishments in the United States
Companies established in 1927
Chemical companies established in 1927